Li Tenglong (born 6 January 2001) is a Chinese footballer who plays as a midfielder.

Club career
Li was born in Moscow, Russia, to a Chinese mother from Xi'an and Vietnamese father. He joined Russian Premier League side CSKA Moscow in 2007, and stayed with the club for twelve years. He moved to Spain and joined Granada in February 2019, but in May of the same year, he suffered a fracture in his left leg, keeping him out for the majority of the season. He was promoted to the club's 'B' team, Recreativo Granada, in 2020, but suffered another injury in May 2021, this time to his right leg, and missed another season.

He returned to footballing action in February 2022, when he was loaned to sixth-tier FC Cubillas.

International career
Li's mother made sure he retained his Chinese citizenship. He has been approached by both the Russian and Vietnamese footballing associations to represent each nation. He was first called up to the China youth teams in 2018, playing at the Weifang Cup, despite being two years younger than his compatriots. He was called up to the under-21 squad in 2022, his first call-up in three years.

Career statistics

Club

Notes

References

2001 births
Living people
Footballers from Moscow
Russian people of Chinese descent
Russian people of Vietnamese descent
Russian footballers
Chinese footballers
China youth international footballers
Association football midfielders
PFC CSKA Moscow players
Granada CF footballers
Club Recreativo Granada players
Chinese expatriate footballers
Chinese expatriate sportspeople in Spain
Expatriate footballers in Spain